The 2016–17 season was Szombathelyi Haladás's 61st competitive season, 9th consecutive season in the OTP Bank Liga and 97th year in existence as a football club.

Players 
As of 14 June 2014.

Players transferred during the season

Summer

In:

Out:

Winter

In:

Out:

Nemzeti Bajnokság I

League table

Matches

Hungarian Cup

Friendly games (2016)

Friendly games (2017)

References

Szombathelyi Haladás seasons
Szombathelyi Haladas